Omura (小村) or Ōmura (大村) are Japanese surnames, but may also refer to:
 Ōmura, Nagasaki, a city located in Nagasaki Prefecture, Japan
 Omura's whale (Balaenoptera omurai), a species of rorqual about which very little is known

People
 Ōmura Masujirō (大村 益次郎, 1824-1869), a Japanese military leader and theorist in Bakumatsu period Japan
 Ōmura Sumihiro (大村 純熈, 1830-1882), the 13th and final daimyō of Ōmura Domain in Hizen Province, Kyūshū, Japan
 Ōmura Sumitada (大村 純忠, 1533-1587), a Japanese daimyō lord of the Sengoku period
 Ōmura Yoshiaki, a ruling head of the clan of Omura throughout the latter Sengoku Period of Feudal Japan
 Hideaki Ōmura (大村 秀章, born 1960), a Japanese politician and the governor of Aichi Prefecture
 Jim K. Omura (born 1940), an electrical engineer and information theorist
, Japanese footballer
 Norio Omura (小村 徳男, born 1969), a former Japanese football defender
 Satoshi Omura (大村 智, born  1935), a Japanese microbiologist
 Seiichi Ōmura (大村 清一, 1892-1968), politician and cabinet minister

Japanese-language surnames